The Cavalry–Forge rivalry is a soccer rivalry between Calgary-based Cavalry FC and Forge FC of Hamilton, Ontario. The two clubs began play in 2019 and faced each other nine times that season with all matches being decided by one goal or fewer. The clubs were the top teams in the inaugural Canadian Premier League season and the natural rivalry that developed between them has been described as the best in the league.

History

The first match between Cavalry and Forge was played on May 12, 2019, at Tim Hortons Field in Hamilton. Cavalry won the game 2–1 with the winning goal from Nico Pasquotti coming late in stoppage time. The following month, the two clubs met in the second round of the 2019 Canadian Championship. Once again, Cavalry scored late into stoppage time in Hamilton; this time on a penalty kick to equalize after Forge goalkeeper Quillan Roberts was sent off for a foul. The drama continued after the match when a scrum broke out between the two teams with opposing players exchanging pushes and shouts.

The day after the match, Cavalry player Jordan Brown accused Forge FC coach Peter Reynders of using racist remarks during the post game scrum, a claim which was supported by his teammates Elijah Adekugbe and Nathan Mavila. Following an investigation, Reynders was initially found to be guilty by the Canadian Soccer Association and suspended 45 days for the incident, however the decision was overturned on appeal. In June 2020, Forge players defended Reynders publicly. The case was referred to a third party, and Reynders was cleared of the charges in August 2020. The match and subsequent allegations are considered to be the first significant moment of the rivalry. In the return leg of the Canadian Championship tie at ATCO Field, Cavalry won 2–1 to advance in the competition.

On June 22, 2019, Forge and Cavalry faced off for the fourth time that season and the third time in 19 days. With a draw, Cavalry could clinch the top record in the 10-game spring season while Forge needed a win to remain in contention. Forge won the game 1–0 on an early goal from captain Kyle Bekker, ending Cavalry's run of seven straight wins to start the season. Cavalry won their following game on June 26 to claim the spring title and a spot in the 2019 Canadian Premier League Finals. Forge secured their place in the finals with a win on September 28.

Forge hosted the first leg of the 2019 CPL Finals on October 26 in Hamilton. In the 37th minute, Cavalry defender Joel Waterman handled the ball in his own penalty area while sliding to prevent a scoring chance. Waterman was sent off and Forge was awarded a penalty kick. League-leading scorer Tristan Borges took the penalty kick but it was stopped by Marco Carducci to keep the game scoreless. Late into first half stoppage time, Borges scored the game's only goal, beating Carducci with a left-footed strike to give Forge the lead going into halftime. In the 69th minute, a challenge between Borges and Jay Wheeldon of Cavalry sent both players to the ground. As a result of the play, Borges was shown a red card and both teams finished the match with 10 players. After the match, Cavalry and Forge appealed their respective red cards to the Canadian Soccer Association but only the suspension to Forge's Tristan Borges was overturned, allowing him to play in the second leg. During the second leg in Calgary on November 2, a total of seven yellow cards were issued. Forge scored the game's only goal late in stoppage time and won the series 2–0 on aggregate, becoming the first-ever champions of the Canadian Premier League.

The season opener of the 2020 CPL Island Games was chosen to be a rematch of the 2019 final. The match ended a 2–2 draw with Cavalry equalizing in the 94th minute with a controversial penalty kick. Forge would get their revenge by defeating Cavalry 1–0 in their final group stage match to clinch a spot in the 2020 Canadian Premier League Final while also eliminating Cavalry.

In their fourth and final regular season meeting of 2022, Forge defeated Cavalry in a match that featured three goals and three red cards. The two clubs ended the regular season with identical records (14–5–9), finishing 2nd and 3rd and earning a meeting in the CPL semifinals. Following a 1–1 draw in the first leg, Forge won 3–2 on aggregate to advance to its fourth consecutive CPL Final. In the second leg, Kyle Bekker of Forge and David Norman Jr. of Cavalry were both sent off within five minutes of each other in the first half.

Results

Statistics

League ranking by season

Records

Top goalscorers

Clean sheets

Discipline

Players who played for both clubs

Forge, then Cavalry
  Anthony Novak (Forge: 2019–2020, Cavalry: 2021–present)

See also 
 905 Derby
 Al Classico
 Canadian Classique

References 

Forge
Forge FC
Soccer rivalries in Canada
2019 establishments in Canada
Canadian Premier League